The women's madison competition at the 2019  UEC European Track Championships was held on 20 October 2019.

Results
120 laps (30 km) were raced with 12 sprints.

References

Women's madison
European Track Championships – Women's madison